Christine Brennan (born May 14, 1958) is a sports columnist for USA Today, a commentator on ABC News, CNN, PBS NewsHour and NPR, and a best-selling author. She was the first female sports reporter for the Miami Herald in 1981, the first woman at the Washington Post on the Washington Redskins beat in 1985, and the first president of the Association for Women in Sports Media in 1988.

Career 

Brennan received bachelor's and master's degrees from the Medill School of Journalism at Northwestern University. After graduating, she began working for the Miami Herald, becoming the Herald's first female sports reporter in 1981. She covered the Miami Hurricanes during their trip to the 1984 Orange Bowl national championship game, after which she wrote her first book, The Miracle of Miami. At the game, she connected with former classmate Michael Wilbon, who recommended her to his Washington Post editors; she joined the Post's sports staff shortly thereafter. She covered the Washington Redskins beat for three years, then moved on to covering the Olympic Games. She worked for the Post for 12 years before joining USA Today as its national sports columnist in 1997.

She has written seven books on sports, including best-selling Inside Edge, about Olympic figure skating, which was named one of the top 100 sports books of all time by Sports Illustrated in 2002. She is an on-air commentator for ABC News, CNN, PBS NewsHour, and NPR. She has covered every Olympic Games, summer and winter, since the 1984 Summer Olympics in Los Angeles.

Advocacy 
In 1988, Brennan was elected the first president of the Association for Women in Sports Media. A longtime advocate for women in sports journalism, she started AWSM's scholarship-internship program for female journalism students, which has honored more than 140 students. She funds two of the scholarships, which are named after her late parents.

Brennan, a nationally known speaker, has written and spoken on issues ranging from the importance of Title IX to the behavior of professional athletes to the scourge of performance-enhancing drug use in sports. Her USA Today columns on Augusta National Golf Club helped trigger the national debate on the club's lack of female members.

Brennan is a leading voice on many topics involving sports in society, including the Ray Rice/domestic violence story. She is among the sports journalists to publicly pledge to no longer use the Washington Redskins name in her columns.

Personal life 
Brennan is from Toledo, Ohio. Her relationship with her father in the context of sports fandom is covered in her memoir, Best Seat in the House. Brennan is a member of the Board of Trustees of Northwestern University and a national trustee at the University of Toledo.

Awards
1993 Capital Press Women's "Woman of Achievement"
1995 Inductee—Ohio Women's Hall of Fame
2001 and 2003 Associated Press Sports Editors—Top 10 columnists in the category of the nation's biggest newspapers
2002 U.S. Sports Academy's Ronald Reagan media award
2003 Jake Wade Award from the College Sports Information Directors of America for outstanding media contribution to intercollegiate athletics
2004 Association for Women in Sports Media—Pioneer Award
2004 Northwestern University Medill School of Journalism Hall of Achievement inductee
2005 Woman of the Year from WISE (Women in Sports and Events)
2006 Inaugural Billie Award in Journalism 
2006 Inductee—Ottawa Hills (Ohio) Foundation Hall of Fame
2006 Alumnae Award winner from The Alumnae of Northwestern University
2007 Northwestern University Alumni Service Award
2008 Inaugural Northwestern University Women's Athletics Alumnae Award
2013 Yale University Kiphuth Medal
2013 Ralph McGill Lecturer at the University of Georgia
2016 Association for Women in Sports Media-Ann Miller Service Award
2016 Washington DC Sports Hall of Fame
2017 Northwestern Athletics Hall of Fame
2020 Red Smith Award

References

External links 

Christine Brennan Official Site
Christine Brennan's columns at USAToday.com

1958 births
American sportswriters
Figure skating commentators
Women sports announcers
Medill School of Journalism alumni
Writers from Toledo, Ohio
Living people
Women sportswriters
Journalists from Ohio
Red Smith Award recipients